The Iranian ambassador in Baghdad is the official representative of the Government in Tehran to the Government of Iraq.

List of representatives

See also
Iran–Iraq relations

References 

 
Iraq
Iran